Rose-Girl Resli is a 1954 West German drama film directed by Harald Reinl and starring Christine Kaufmann, Josefin Kipper and Paul Klinger. The film made the child actress Kaufmann into a star. It was the debut film of the actress Karin Dor, who later married the director. It was shot at the Wiesbaden Studios in Hesse and on location in the vicinity. The film's sets were designed by the art director Heinrich Beisenherz.

Cast

References

Bibliography

External links 
 

1954 films
1954 drama films
West German films
German drama films
1950s German-language films
Films directed by Harald Reinl
Films about orphans
Films based on Swiss novels
Constantin Film films
German black-and-white films
1950s German films